The  Diocese of Puerto Escondido is a Latin Church ecclesiastical territory or diocese of the Catholic Church in Mexico. It is a suffragan in the ecclesiastical province of the metropolitan Archdiocese of Antequera.

On 31 October 2012, Pope Benedict XVI appointed Pedro Vázquez Villalobos as Bishop of Puerto Escondido. The diocese's episcopal see is Puerto Escondido.

Ordinaries
Eduardo Cirilo Carmona Ortega, O.R.C. (November 8, 2003–June 27, 2012), appointed Bishop of Parral, Chihuahua
Pedro Vázquez Villalobos (October 31, 2012–February 10, 2018), appointed Archbishop of Antequera, Oaxaca
Florencio Armando Colín Cruz (February 16, 2019 - )

External links and references

Roman Catholic dioceses in Mexico
Puerto Escondido
Puerto Escondido
Roman Catholic Ecclesiastical Province of Antequera, Oaxaca